Ahmat is a Chadian surname. Notable people with the surname include:
 Adji Ahmat, former Chadian football player
 Jim Ahmat (born 1983), Australian rugby league player
 Linda Ahmat (born 1952), former Papua New Guinea lawn bowler
 Matthew Ahmat (born 1974), former Australian rules footballer
 Robert Ahmat (born 1977), former Australian rules footballer
 Vanessa Lee-AhMat (born 1971), Australian scholar

Surnames of Chadian origin